Kristen Thomas (born July 1, 1993) is an American rugby sevens player. She competed at the 2020 Summer Olympics.

Early life 
Thomas participated in track and field and basketball in high school. She began her rugby career as a freshman at the University of Central Florida. She is openly lesbian.

Career 
Thomas made her debut for the United States sevens team at the 2015 São Paulo Women's Sevens. She won a silver medal at the 2015 Pan American Games as a member of the United States women's national rugby sevens team. 

Thomas missed out on selection for the 2016 Summer Olympics squad due to an injury she sustained at the 2016 France Women's Sevens. She was named in the Eagles 2017 Women's Rugby World Cup squad.

Thomas was selected to represent the United States at the 2022 Rugby World Cup Sevens in Cape Town.

References

External links
 Kristen Thomas at USA Rugby
 
 

1993 births
Living people
United States international rugby sevens players
American female rugby union players
Female rugby sevens players
American female rugby sevens players
Pan American Games silver medalists for the United States
Pan American Games medalists in rugby sevens
Rugby sevens players at the 2015 Pan American Games
Medalists at the 2015 Pan American Games
Rugby sevens players at the 2020 Summer Olympics
Olympic rugby sevens players of the United States
American LGBT sportspeople
21st-century American women